The University of Cincinnati College of Design, Architecture, Art, and Planning, commonly referred to as DAAP, is a college of the University of Cincinnati. Located in the university's main campus in Cincinnati, Ohio, DAAP is consistently ranked as one of the most prestigious design schools in the U.S. and the world.  The University of Cincinnati was also the only public school listed in I.D. Magazine's list of the top ten design schools worldwide.

For 2005, the graduate architecture program was ranked second in the nation after Harvard and ranked as the most innovative architecture program in the nation. Two of "The New York Five" architects attended the University of Cincinnati: Michael Graves and John Hejduk (though Hejduk did not ultimately graduate from the program).

In 2008, the interior design program was ranked first in the nation for the ninth consecutive year in "America's Best Architecture & Design Schools", published by DesignIntelligence. New to the list in 2006 was the school's industrial design program ranking at No. 2, besting the Center for Creative Studies in Detroit and second only to the prestigious Art Center College of Design in California. The combination of these three top-ranking disciplines gave the college of DAAP the title as the Best Art College in the nation.

In 2012, Business Insider ranked the world’s best 25 design schools listing DAAP as third, second only to RISD and MIT.

The college is also known for having the only School of Planning in the U.S. to have accredited programs at the undergraduate, graduate, and doctorate levels. Born out of the School of Architecture in 1961, their postgraduate degrees have been ranked at near the top in the Midwest as well as in the top 20 nationwide.

The college is distinguished for its mandatory co-operative education program, which was first conceived at the University of Cincinnati College of Engineering in 1906. Students alternate between working as paid employees in design firms and attending classes, giving them experience that enables them to easily enter the workplace after graduation. Students are required to spend a certain amount of time in the workplace, usually adding up to several years of job experience, before they are able to graduate. This extends most of the programs that would normally be four-year programs into five or more years.

Facilities
The college is housed in a facility consisting of four buildings: Frederick H. and Eleanora C.U. Alms Memorial Hall (1952, known simply as Alms), DAA Addition (1956, now referred to as the DAAP Building on most signage in the complex), the Wolfson Center for Environmental Design (1972), and the newest addition, the Aronoff Center. The Aronoff Center, which ties together the three older buildings and houses the college library, cafeteria, auditorium, art supply store, and photography lab, was designed by Peter Eisenman and opened in 1996.

Programs
School of Design
Fashion Design
Fashion Product Development
Graphic Communication Design (Print/Motion/Interaction focus)
Industrial Design (Design track/Transportation track) - #1 in the nation, and MSD #2 in the nation. 
Master of Design
School of Architecture and Interior Design
Architecture (BS, MArch, MSArch, & PhD in Architecture)-#6 in the nation 
Interior Design #1 in the nation 
School of Art
Art History
Fine Arts
Postgraduate:
Art Education
Art History
Fine Arts
Certificate in Museum Studies
School of Planning
Urban Planning
Urban Studies
Postgraduate:
Community Planning
Master of Landscape Architecture
Regional Development Planning (PhD)
Horticulture
Bachelor of Science in Horticulture
Certificates in Urban Design, Public Art and Public Space, Horticulture, Green Roofs, Sustainable Landscape Design, Urban Agriculture and Urban Landscapes

Student groups
American Institute of Architecture Students
The American Institute of Architecture Students is a national group dedicated to services interests for architecture students at universities nationwide.  A student chapter is maintained in the College of Design, Architecture, Art, and Planning to provide early association with the professional parent group, and permit participation in architectural activities on both a local and national basis. Lectures by practicing architects and designers, discussion groups, visits to conferences, exhibitions, and important building sites are some of the chapter's yearly activities.
American Institute of Graphic Arts
The AIGA student group is an organization of ambitious designers who are focused on promoting design awareness and excellence. The group's obtainable objectives are creating a design mentoring program, as well as hosting prominent designers from across the country to lecture at the University of Cincinnati.
Alpha Rho Chi
Alpha Rho Chi is a co-educational professional fraternity for students who are in the Architecture field, an allied field, or have a great interest in either of the two.
DAAP Union
Membership in the DAAP Union is open to all undergraduate DAAP students. The Union serves to stimulate, coordinate, and sponsor various student activities. It also provides liaison with the Student Senate of the university and with the college faculty and administration through representation on many college committees.
Fashion Design Student Association
Design students join this organization to promote social and professional activities with students at UC and in other schools, to sponsor programs and lectures, and to participate in community and professional activities.
Fine Arts Association
The Fine Arts Association is an artists' organization, structured specifically to give undergraduate School of Art students a forum for the exploration and exhibition of their individual and shared expression. The FAA offers opportunities for development as an artist through the exchange of ideas as well as a chance for young artists to show their work. Through association sponsorship, the FAA provides a means for students to see shows at a distance from Cincinnati.
Industrial Designers Society of America
The purposes of this student group are to further professional knowledge, to encourage contact (social and professional) with fellow students at the University of Cincinnati and other schools, and to sponsor programs and industrial design activities not otherwise provided in the classroom.
International Interior Design Association
A student chapter is maintained in the college to project and maintain artistic and ethical concepts of the interior design profession on an apprentice level, to promote high standards in public relations and design integrity, and to train for eventual professional practice. Guest speakers and designers assist in the chapter's yearly program.
Planning Student Organization
This organization provides better communication among students in the School of Planning, and gives students a vehicle to participate in planning events on both a local and national level.
Students for Ecological Design [SED]
SED was created to bring together and transmit knowledge between a collective of people interested in the education, promotion, and implementation of environmentally focused design. Specific goals include: promoting sustainable design education, sponsoring student participation in workshops and conferences, and playing an active role in applying these ideas throughout the community.
DAAPCares 
DAAPCares is a student-run organization aimed at promoting and practicing social design.

References

External links
UC College of DAAP official site

Design, Architecture, Art, and Planning, College of
Art schools in Ohio
Arts in Cincinnati
Educational institutions established in 1819